Glenmark Pharmaceuticals Limited is an Indian multinational pharmaceutical company headquartered in Mumbai, India.

History 
it was founded in 1977 by Gracias Saldanha as a generic drug and active pharmaceutical ingredient manufacturer; he named the company after his two sons. The company initially sold its products in India, Russia, and Africa. The company went public in India in 1999, and used some of the proceeds to build its first research facility. Saldanha's son Glenn took over as CEO in 2001, having returned to India after working at PricewaterhouseCoopers. By 2008 Glenmark was the fifth-biggest pharmaceutical company in India.

By 2011 the founder of the company was one of the richest men in India, and Glenmark had worldwide sales of $778 million, a 37% increase over the last year's sales; the growth was driven by Glenmark's entry into the US and European generics markets.

In the mid-2010s the generics industry in general began transitioning to the end of an era of giant patent cliffs in the pharmaceutical industry; patented drugs with sales of around $28 billion were set to come off patent in 2018, but in 2019 only about $10 billion in revenue was set to open for competition, and less the next year. Companies in the industry responded with consolidation or trying to generate new, patented drugs.

Glenn Saldanha took the company down the path of seeking innovation, which was controversial within the company and with shareholders. The company focused on new drugs and biosimilars in the fields of cancer, dermatology and respiratory diseases, which it sought to monetize by partnering with major pharmaceutical companies.

In 2016 it had four such drugs in clinical trials. For the financial year 2016–2017 its sales were around 81 billion INR (ca. $1.25 billion), making it the fourth-biggest Indian pharmaceutical company.

In May 2019, Yasir Rawjee was elected as CEO of Glenmark Life Sciences.

Selected products

Glenmark Pharmaceuticals announced that it entered into an exclusive licensing agreement with Australia's Sequirus to commercialize its nasal spray Ryaltris™ which is a fixed-dose combination nasal spray of an antihistamine and a steroid, as a treatment for seasonal allergic rhinitis (SAR). Ryaltris (olopatadine hydrochloride [665 mcg] and mometasone furoate [25 mcg]), formerly GSP 301 Nasal Spray, has been conditionally accepted by the FDA as the brand name.

In June 2020, the company launched a potential COVID-19 drug Favipiravir under the brand name FabiFlu in India after studies found that there was some benefit of the drug in COVID-19 treatment. In August 2020, they also rolled out a higher strength version of FabiFlu.

Notes and references

External links
 

Manufacturing companies based in Mumbai
Pharmaceutical companies of India
Pharmaceutical companies established in 1977
Indian companies established in 1977
1977 establishments in Maharashtra
Companies listed on the National Stock Exchange of India
Companies listed on the Bombay Stock Exchange